Martin Leslie (born 25 October 1971, Wellington, New Zealand) is a New Zealand born former professional rugby union player who played provincial rugby for Wellington and the Hurricanes before moving to play international rugby for Scotland, for whom he qualified through grandparents.  He played primarily in the back row, winning 37 caps between 1998 and 2003.  His brother John also played for Scotland at the same time as him.

External links
Profile & Statistics at Sporting Heroes.net

Otago rugby union players
New Zealand people of Scottish descent
Scotland international rugby union players
1971 births
Living people
Rugby union flankers